Tres Alpes (literally, "Three Alps"), was the collective term used by the Romans to denote three small provinces of the Roman empire situated in the western Alps mountain range, namely Alpes Graiae (or Poeninae) (Val d'Aosta, Italy); Alpes Cottiae (Val di Susa, Italy); and Alpes Maritimae. The region was annexed by the Romans in 16–14 BC and the three provinces organised by 7 BC.

See also 
 Roman empire
 Alpine regiments of the Roman army

Citations

References 
 Cambridge Ancient History 2nd Ed: Vol X (1996) The Augustan Empire